Montejano is a Spanish surname. Notable people with the surname include:
Amanda Montejano, Mexican mathematician
David Montejano (born 1948), American sociologist and historian
Emanuel Montejano (born 2001), Mexican footballer
María Montejano (born 1986), Spanish skeleton racer

See also
Luis Gómez-Montejano (1922–2017), Spanish football executive

Spanish-language surnames